Hulta is a settlement in Kalmar County, Sweden.

References
 

Populated places in Kalmar County